Cemil Sait Barlas (1905 – 10 October 1964) was a Turkish judge, politician and journalist. He served as government minister.

Life
Cemil Sait was born in İstanbul, Ottoman Empire in 1905. His father Mehmet Sait was a judge. After graduating from Istanbul University, Faculty of Law in 1929, he went to Germany, where he obtained  a doctoral degree from Heidelberg University.

After returning to Turkey, and served as a judge, a courthouse inspector and legal advisor at Etibank a state owner bank.
 
He married Emine Şahingiray, who gave birth to two sons and a daughter. One of his sons, Mehmet Barlas, is a journalist.

Barlas died in Hendek, Sakarya Province on 10 October 1964 due to a traffic accident.

Career
Cemil Sait Barlas joined the Republican People's Party (CHP) in 1943. In the 17th government of Turkey between 10 June 1948 and 16 January 1949, served as the Minister of Commerce. He kept his seat in the 18th government of Turkey until 7 June 1949 when he was appointed as the Minister of State. The CHP lost the majority in the parliament in the  1950 general election, and he lost his post on 22 May 1950.

After 1950, Barlas began journalism and published two newspapers. The first Pazar Postası (1951–1953) was a weekly and the second Son Havadis was a daily (1953–1958). Although both papers were political, there was also a page of literature, and the papers contributed to the contemporary literary discussions.

In the 1957 general election, he was a CHP candidate from Gaziantep Province. According to the official announcements, he won the election, But later the results were altered, and Barlas lost the election due to objections by other political parties.

In 1960, he sold his newspaper, and retired from journalism. He was appointed director general of the insurance company of national reassurance. He authored a book "Sosyalistlik Yolları ve Türkiye Gerçeği" ("The Ways of Socialism and the Reality in Turkey") in 1962.

References

Turkish judges
Turkish civil servants
Republican People's Party (Turkey) politicians
Deputies of Gaziantep
Members of the 7th Parliament of Turkey
Members of the 7th government of Turkey
Members of the 8th government of Turkey
Members of the 18th government of Turkey
Government ministers of Turkey
Turkish newspaper publishers (people)
Journalists from Istanbul
Lawyers from Istanbul
Istanbul University alumni
Istanbul University Faculty of Law alumni
Heidelberg University alumni
1905 births
1964 deaths
Road incident deaths in Turkey
20th-century journalists
Turkish expatriates in Germany
Politicians from Istanbul